Ricardo Mello won the first edition of the tournament against Eduardo Schwank 6–4, 6–2 in the final.

Seeds

Draw

Finals

Top half

Bottom half

References
 Main Draw
 Qualifying Draw

BVA Open - Singles